Venturini is a surname. Notable people with the surname include:

 Andrea Venturini (born 1996), Italian footballer
 Angela Venturini (born 1964), Dutch cricketer
 Atilije Venturini (1908–1944), Yugoslav swimmer
 Aurora Venturini (1922–2015), Argentine novelist, short story writer, poet, translator and essayist
 Bruno Venturini (1911–1991), Italian football goalkeeper
 Cláudio Venturini (born 1958), Brazilian guitarist, vocalist and composer
 Clément Venturini (born 1993), French cyclist
 Emilio Venturini (1878–1952), Italian operatic lyric tenor 
 Fernanda Porto Venturini (born 1970), Brazilian former volleyball player 
 Flávio Hugo Venturini (born 1949), Brazilian singer and songwriter
 Francesco Venturini (–1745), Baroque composer
 Franco Venturini (born 1959), Italian rower
 Gaspare Venturini, Italian painter, active in Ferrara between 1576 and 1593
 Gian Carlo Venturini (born 1962), Captain Regent of San Marino in 1996–1997
 Giancarlo Venturini, Italian fashion designer and artist
 Giorgio Venturini (1906–1984), Italian film producer
 Giovanni Venturini (born 1991), Italian professional racing driver 
 Giovanni Francesco Venturini (1650–1710), Roman Baroque engraver
 Jean Venturini (1919–1940), French surrealist poet
 Karl Heinrich Venturini (1768–1849), German theologian
 Marco Venturini (born 1960), Italian former sport shooter 
 Mark Venturini (1961–1996), American actor
 Roberto Venturini (born 1960), Captain Regent of San Marino in 2015, with Andrea Belluzzi
 Serge Venturini (born 1955), French poet
 Tisha Venturini (born 1973), American soccer player
 Wendy Venturini (born 1979), American TV motorsport presenter

See also
 Venturini Motorsports
 Venturi (disambiguation)
 Palazzo Venturini, a palace located in central Parma, region of Emilia-Romagna, Italy

it:Venturini